The 2022 IIHF Women's World Championship was an international ice hockey tournament organized by the International Ice Hockey Federation (IIHF) which was contested in Herning and Frederikshavn, Denmark from 25 August to 4 September 2022, at the KVIK Hockey Arena, and Scanel Hockey Arena. Historically, a top division tournament was not played during Olympic years, but in September 2021, the IIHF announced the change to play the tournament each year, even during Olympic years.

Canada defeated the United States 2–1 in to win their 12th title.

Participants

1 (expelled)
2

1 Pursuant to a December 2020 ruling by the Court of Arbitration for Sport on doping sanctions, Russian athletes and teams are prohibited from competing under the Russian flag or using the Russian national anthem at any Olympic Games or world championships through 16 December 2022, and must compete as "neutral athlete[s]." For IIHF tournaments, the Russian team will play under the name "ROC". Instead of the Russian national anthem being played at the 2021 World Championship, Piano Concerto No.1 by Pyotr Ilyich Tchaikovsky was played. Russia was expelled on 1 March 2022 due to the 2022 Russian invasion of Ukraine.
2 Sweden replaced Russia.

Rosters

Each team's roster consisted of at least 15 skaters (forwards and defencemen) and two goaltenders, and at most 20 skaters and three goaltenders. All ten participating nations, through the confirmation of their respective national associations, had to submit a "Long List" roster no later than two weeks before the tournament.

Match officials
Eleven referees and ten linesmen were selected for the tournament.

Preliminary round
All times are local (UTC+2).

Group A

Group B

Knockout stage
There was a re-seeding after the quarterfinals.

Bracket

Quarterfinals

5–8th place semifinals

Semifinals

Fifth place game

Third place game

Final

Awards and statistics
The awards were announced on 4 September 2022.

Awards

Directorate Awards

All-Star team

Scoring leaders
List shows the top skaters sorted by points, then goals.

GP = Games played; G = Goals; A = Assists; Pts = Points; +/− = Plus/minus; PIM = Penalties in minutes; POS = Position
Source: IIHF

Leading goaltenders
Only the top five goaltenders, based on save percentage, who have played at least 40% of their team's minutes, are included in this list.

TOI = Time on ice (minutes:seconds); SA = Shots against; GA = Goals against; GAA = Goals against average; Sv% = Save percentage; SO = Shutouts
Source: IIHF

Final standings

References

External links
Official website

IIHF Women's World Championship
2022 IIHF Women's World Championship
IIHF Women's World Championship
IIHF Women's World Championship
Sports events affected by the 2022 Russian invasion of Ukraine
IIHF
IIHF